The Gruzino estate near Chudovo, Russia, was constructed by a team of Neoclassical architects under Vasily Petrovich Stasov for Count Alexey Arakcheyev in the 1810s.

Count Arakcheyev chose Gruzino as an imperial gift from Emperor Paul when Arakcheyev was appointed Commandant of St. Petersburg, though the area was in disrepair.  He was given the land despite prior claim to it by the governor of the Novgorod and Tver provinces.  Using serf labor, Arakcheyev built Gruzino to one of the most up-to-date estates in Russia at the time. The celebrated sculptor Ivan Martos contributed a statue of Emperor Paul.  Two months after Arakcheyev's death, Emperor Nicholas gave the estate to the Novgorod Cadet Corps.

Although it is stated officially that the manor was destroyed by the Nazi German troops during the World War II, other sources maintain that the estate was wiped out in the 1930s, during Joseph Stalin's industrialisation process. The statues of lions formerly adorning the porch are all that remains from this Neoclassical ensemble. They were transported and mounted for display in the Novgorod Kremlin.

External links
 Article in Russian
 Restoration of timepiece from Gruzino estate

References
Jenkins, Michael. (1969) Arakcheev: Grand Vizier of the Russian Empire. The Dial Press, Inc. 

Buildings and structures in Novgorod Oblast
Neoclassical architecture in Russia
Vasily Stasov buildings and structures
Cultural heritage monuments in Novgorod Oblast
Objects of cultural heritage of Russia of regional significance